Ellis Ferreira and Rick Leach were the defending champions, but lost in the third round this year.

Wayne Black and Sandon Stolle won the title, defeating Boris Becker and Jan-Michael Gambill 6–1, 6–1 in the final.

Seeds

  Mahesh Bhupathi /  Leander Paes (second round)
  Todd Woodbridge /  Mark Woodforde (third round)
  Mark Knowles /  Daniel Nestor (second round)
  Ellis Ferreira /  Rick Leach (third round)
  Sébastien Lareau /  Alex O'Brien (second round)
  Patrick Galbraith /  Paul Haarhuis (second round)
  Wayne Black /  Sandon Stolle (champions)
  Olivier Delaître /  Fabrice Santoro (second round)
  David Adams /  John-Laffnie de Jager (second round)
  Jonas Björkman /  Joshua Eagle (second round)
  Yevgeny Kafelnikov /  Daniel Vacek (second round)
  Piet Norval /  Kevin Ullyett (second round)
  Martin Damm /  Cyril Suk (quarterfinals)
  Jiří Novák /  David Rikl (second round)
  Jim Grabb /  Jared Palmer (second round)
  Andrew Florent /  David Macpherson (quarterfinals)

Draw

Finals

Top half

Section 1

Section 2

Bottom half

Section 3

Section 4

References

 Main Draw

Men's Doubles
1999 ATP Tour